The "Haydn" Quartets by Wolfgang Amadeus Mozart are a set of six string quartets published in 1785 in Vienna as his Op. 10, dedicated to the composer Joseph Haydn. They contain some of Mozart's most memorable melodic writing and refined compositional thought.

The six quartets

String Quartet No. 14 in G major, ("Spring"), K. 387, Op. 10, No. 1 (31 December 1782)
String Quartet No. 15 in D minor, K. 421/417b, Op. 10, No. 2 (17 June 1783)
String Quartet No. 16 in E-flat major, K. 428/421b, Op. 10, No. 4 (June–July 1783)
String Quartet No. 17 in B-flat major ("Hunt"), K. 458, Op. 10, No. 3 (9 November 1784)
String Quartet No. 18 in A major, K. 464, Op. 10, No. 5 (10 January 1785)
String Quartet No. 19 in C major ("Dissonance"), K. 465, Op. 10, No. 6 (14 January 1785)
The quartets were published in a set (labelled Mozart's "Op. 10") in Vienna, 1785. Dates of completion are shown in parentheses above. Mozart arranged the six quartets in the order of composition, except for reversing the order of K. 428 and K. 458.

Historical background
Wolfgang Amadeus Mozart composed 23 string quartets. The six "Haydn" Quartets were written in Vienna during the years 1782 to 1785. They are dedicated to the composer Joseph Haydn, who is considered the creator of the modern string quartet. Haydn had recently completed his influential "Opus 33" set of quartets in 1781, the year that Mozart arrived in Vienna. During this time, Haydn and Mozart had become friends, and sometimes played quartets together in Mozart's apartment, with Mozart playing the viola, and Haydn playing violin; see Haydn and Mozart.

Haydn first heard the quartets at two gatherings at Mozart's home, 15 January and 12 February 1785 (on these occasions he apparently just listened, rather than playing a part himself). After hearing them all, Haydn made a now-famous remark to Mozart's father Leopold, who was visiting from Salzburg: "Before God, and as an honest man, I tell you that your son is the greatest composer known to me either in person or by name. He has taste, and, what is more, the most profound knowledge of composition." The comment was preserved in a letter Leopold wrote 16 February to his daughter Nannerl.

Dedication

Mozart's published dedication page (1 September 1785):

To my dear friend Haydn,

A father who had resolved to send his children out into the great world took it to be his duty to confide them to the protection and guidance of a very celebrated Man, especially when the latter by good fortune was at the same time his best Friend. Here they are then, O great Man and dearest Friend, these six children of mine. They are, it is true, the fruit of a long and laborious endeavor, yet the hope inspired in me by several Friends that it may be at least partly compensated encourages me, and I flatter myself that this offspring will serve to afford me solace one day. You, yourself, dearest friend, told me of your satisfaction with them during your last Visit to this Capital. It is this indulgence above all which urges me to commend them to you and encourages me to hope that they will not seem to you altogether unworthy of your favour. May it therefore please you to receive them kindly and to be their Father, Guide and Friend! From this moment I resign to you all my rights in them, begging you however to look indulgently upon the defects which the partiality of a Father's eye may have concealed from me, and in spite of them to continue in your generous Friendship for him who so greatly values it, in expectation of which I am, with all of my Heart, my dearest Friend, your most Sincere Friend,

W. A. Mozart

Form and content
The Classical string quartet form was created by Joseph Haydn in the late 1750s. He is described as the "father" of the string quartet because in his total of sixty-eight quartets he developed this genre into its first maturity. The string quartet features four parts for two violins, viola and cello. Its function was designed for private or semi-private performances in the aristocratic salon or middle-class parlor.

The form of the "Haydn" Quartets follows the standard set by Haydn in the 1770s. At this time, the quartet began to consistently have four movements, like the symphony form. The basic form of the six "Haydn" Quartets is as follows, with the second and third movements interchangeable in different works:

First movement: Allegro in sonata form
Second movement: Adagio or Andante in sonata form
Third movement: Minuetto and Trio
Fourth movement: Allegro in sonata, rondo, or variation form

The slow movement of these works, found in either the second or third movements, are highlighted as the "emotional center" of each quartet. They feature rich cantabile melodic writing with thematic multiplicity and embellishment that displays a departure from the Haydnesque mode.

The quartets also feature a wide range of emotional content from the Sturm und Drang of No. 15 in D minor, to the tonal mysteriousness of the openings of No. 16 in E-flat major, and No. 19 in C major, the "Dissonance", and then to the opera buffa styled light-heartedness in the finale of No. 17 in B-flat major, the "Hunt".

Critical reception

Early reception of the "Haydn" Quartets was both enthusiastic and disgruntled. An anonymous early reviewer, writing in Cramer's Magazin der Musik in 1789, gave a judgment characteristic of reaction to Mozart's music at the time, namely that the works were inspired, but too complex and difficult to enjoy:
Mozart's works do not in general please quite so much [as those of Kozeluch] ... [Mozart's] six quartets for violins, viola, and bass dedicated to Haydn confirm ... that he has a decided leaning towards the difficult and the unusual. But then, what great and elevated ideas he has too, testifying to a bold spirit!

Giuseppe Sarti later published an attack against the "Dissonance" quartet, describing sections as "barbarous", "execrable", and "miserable" in its use of whole-tone clusters and chromatic extremes. Around this same time, Fétis printed a revision of the opening of the "Dissonance" quartet, implying that Mozart had made errors. When the publishers, Artaria, sent the quartets to Italy for publication, they were returned with the report "the engraving is full of mistakes". However, Heinrich Christoph Koch noted that these works were praiseworthy for "their mixture of strict and free styles and the treatment of harmony". Favorable reports of the quartets came soon after their publication from newspapers in Salzburg and Berlin.  In the early 19th century, Jérôme-Joseph de Momigny wrote an extended analysis of No. 15 in D minor, K. 421. Momigny used the setting of text based on Dido's Lament to discuss the emotional and expressive qualities of the first movement of this work.

These works stand as some of Mozart's most famous works. They are considered "established keystones" of the chamber music repertoire and are heard frequently in concerts, radio broadcasts, and recordings.

Notes

References
Deutsch, Otto Erich (1965) Mozart: A Documentary Biography. Stanford, California: Stanford University Press.
Irving, John. Mozart: The "Haydn" Quartets. Cambridge: Cambridge University Press, 1998.
Irving, John. "The Haydn Quartets: K. 387, 421, 428, 458, 464, 465." The Cambridge Mozart Encyclopedia. Ed. Cliff Eisen and Simon P. Keefe. 1 volume. New York: Cambridge University Press, 2006.
Holmes, Edward. The Life of Mozart Including His Correspondence. New York: Da Capo Press, 1979.
Wright, Craig and Simms, Bryan. Music in Western Civilization. Belmont, California: Thomson and Schirmer, 2006.

Further reading
Macek, Bernhard A. (2012) Haydn, Mozart und die Großfürstin: Eine Studie zur Uraufführung der "Russischen Quartette" op. 33 in den Kaiserappartements der Wiener Hofburg (Haydn, Mozart and the Grand Duchess: A Study on the World Premiere of the "Russian Quartets" op. 33 in the Imperial Apartments of the Vienna Hofburg). Vienna: Schloß Schönbrunn Kultur- und Betriebsges.m.b.H., .

External links
Mozart's autograph of the Haydn Quartets, British Library

String quartets by Wolfgang Amadeus Mozart
1785 compositions
Music dedicated to students or teachers